Asito-Craft Cycling Team was a Dutch UCI Continental cycling team focusing on road bicycle racing. As a National level team they got invited to some UCI sanctioned events such as the Flèche du Sud in 2009.

Final roster

Major wins
Sources:

1996
 Olympia's Tour
Stage 8a, Louis de Koning
Stage 10, Rik Reinerink
1997
 Ronde van Noord-Holland, Bjorn Vonk
 Stage 8a Olympia's Tour, Anthony Theus
1998
 ZLM Tour, Gerben Löwik
 Olympia's Tour
Prologue, Paul van Schalen
Stage 7, Anthony Theus
 Ster van Zwolle, Renger Ypenburg
1999
 ZLM Tour, Mark ter Schure
2000
  National Under-23 Road race, Bram Tankink
 OZ Tour Beneden-Maas, Fulco van Gulik
2001
  National Under-23 Road race, Arno Wallaard
2002
 Stage 4 Olympia's Tour, Maarten Lenferink
2004
  National Under-23 Time trial, Thom van Dulmen
 Noord-Nederland Tour
2005
 Ronde van Midden-Nederland, Wim Stroetinga
2006
 Stage 2 Vuelta Ciclista a León, Bauke Mollema
2007
  Overall GP Cycliste de Gemenc, Sander Oostlander
Stage 1, Sander Oostlander
2008
 Ronde van Overijssel, Robin Chaigneau
 Prologue Tour of Romania, Sander Oostlander
2009
 Stage 3 Tour de Berlin, Dennis Luyt
 Stage 7 Tour of Rwanda, Dirk Oude Ophuis

World, Continental & National Champions
2000
  National Under-23 Road race Championships, Bram Tankink
2001
  National Under-23 Road race Championships, Arno Wallaard
2004
  National Under-23 Time trial Championships, Thom van Dulmen

Notes

References

External links

Cycling teams based in Belgium
Defunct cycling teams based in Belgium
Cycling teams established in 1996
Cycling teams disestablished in 2009
1996 establishments in Belgium
2009 disestablishments in Belgium